Sootea is located under Naduar revenue circle, under Tezpur sub-division, formerly in the district of Sonitpur but at present in the district of Biswanath, Assam state, India.

Geography
There  are 103 revenue villages, 128400 bigha 03 katha 10 lecha of land in Sootea sub-circle and its area is 158.90 square kilometres. There is Arunachal Pradesh to the north of Sootea, south bank of the river Brahmaputra River to the south, river Ghiladhari to the east and river Dekorai to the west.

Weather
It is cold in summer. Sootea summer highest day temperature is in between 21 °C to 35 °C . Average temperatures of January is 17 °C , February is 21 °C , March is 24 °C , April is 25 °C , May is 26 °C .

Sights of Sootea

Nagsankar mandir 
The Nagsankar Mandir is one of the oldest and most respected shrines at nagsankar near Sootea, between the border of Sonitpur and biswanath district. It is located at a distance of 45. 7 km Tezpur city center.

Chatia College 

Chatia College is a premier institute of higher learning in Sootea, Dist.- Biswanath, Assam. It was established in the year 1971 with the unwavering endeavour of some leading citizens and the public of greater Sootea area. The College is situated at the heart of Sootea around 1 km away from the NH – 15 in its own plot of land which covers an area of about 54 bighas. The College has Arunachal Pradesh to the North, the mighty Brahmaputra river to the South, the Ghiladhari river to the East, and the Dekorai river to the West. About 72 villages comprise the areas immediately surrounding the College. The serene and eco-friendly campus adds to the beauty of this institution.

chatia higher secondary school

Chatia Higher Secondary School is situated in the Tezpur sub division of this historically important district. During the pre-independence days of India Sootea became one of the important place of the Sonitpur district (then Darrang district). "SOOTEA IS THE ABODE OF GENTLE AND EDUCATED PERSONS"_wrote thus Mr. Sarat ch. Goswami, the only school inspector of Assam Valley in the book of Geography written by him.

Chatia High School a pioneer institution of high education in the eastern part of the river Bharali (from Bharali to Kalabari) has a glorious story to tell.

It was during the time of struggle for independence of India some prominent persons of Biswanath Chariali, Sootea and Jamugurihat seriously thought of establishing a high school. Accordingly the executive committee of Naduar Rayat Sava adopted a resolution to establish a high school at Sootea in the year 1928. The committee also decided to name the school as NADUAR HIGH SCHOOL. It was finally decided to start the school from 1 March 1929. The school admitted 19 students in class seven on the very first day. They were from Biswanath Chariali, Sootea and Jamugurihut. Hem ch. Hazarika BA.BL of Biswanath Chariali was the first Head Master of the school.

In 1938 the school was renamed as SOOTEA HIGH SCHOOL. In course of time students from Kalabari to the river Bharali came to read to read in this school. So the school authority had to build a hostel too. The Sootea M.E. School which had been running in Sootea since 1915 had been amalgamated with the High School.

The school received recognition of the Calcutta University in 1941

(a) As both students and the teachers joined the struggle for independence in 1942 the students of class 'x' of that batch debered themselves from appearing in the Matriculation Examination held in 1943.

(b) Mr. Sailendra Kumar Seal, a student of this school secured second position in the Matriculation Examination held under Guwahati University in 1949.

(c) Mr. Gandha chandra Bormudai of Karati gaon, Sootea enlisted his name in the glorious history of this school as the highest donar. He donated rupees one thousand to the school in 1934. So in honour of Bormudai the school library had been named after him. Still the school library is known as GANDHA CHANDRA BORMUDAI MEMORIAL LIBRARY.

(d) Mr. Ramesh ch. Phukan of Bhakat gaon, Sootea donated two bighas of land to this mighty institution.

(e) Received deficit grant in 1956.

(f) Center for Matriculation Examination in 1972.

(g) Up graded to Higher Secondary level in 1977 with Art stream.

(h) Provincialised in 1977.

(i) Erected one school auditorium in 1960.

(j) Observed a historic, colourful and attractive school week in 1957.

(k) Celebrated Golden Jubilee in 2016 with pomp and grandeur. A historic souvenir was also published on the occasion

Sootea Police Station

Assam chief minister Sarbananda Sonowal inaugurated restored heritage Sootea Police Station under Biswanath district on Monday.

The heritage Sootea Police Station in Biswanath is a testament of  Assam Police's glorious history and an icon of Independence movement, where the national flag was unfurled for the first time in the country on 20 August 1942.

“To protect it, I had sanctioned ₹ 50 lakh last year to the Directorate of Archaeology,” CM Sonowal said in a tweet.

Along with Sonowal, ministers Keshab Mahanta, Ranjit Dutta, Tezpur MP Pallab Lochan Das, MLAs Padma Hazarika and Promod Borthakur were present at the inaugural event.

See also 
Jamugurihat
Nagsankar Mandir
Biswanath district

References

Villages in Sonitpur district